Patrick Tam (born 19 March 1969) is a Hong Kong actor and singer.

Career 
He first set foot into the entertainment industry after winning the 1988 New Talent Awards in Hong Kong alongside another notable Hong Kong singer, Sammi Cheng who was second runner-up.

After an unsuccessful stint in the music industry, Patrick was about to give up a career in the entertainment industry when he was approached by a TVB representative thus embarking on a journey into the world of acting.

He got his first break when he received the Best Supporting Actor award at the 18th annual Hong Kong Film Awards in 1999 for his role as Push Pin in Beast Cops

His next notable achievement was a Best Supporting Actor award at the Taipei Golden Horse Film Festival for his role as Man in Born Wild in 2001.

Personal 
In 1996, Patrick met and eventually dated fellow TVB colleague, actress Astrid Chan before separating over personality differences. In 2003, he married Fiona Chan on Christmas Eve which also happens to be her birthday.

On December 18, 2006 Patrick and Fiona welcomed son, Daniel (譚皓哲) Tam to the family.

On February 21, 2011 Patrick announced the birth of his second child Tamia (譚津如) Tam, with wife Fiona.

Filmography

Films 

Cyber Heist (2023)
Where the Wind Blows (2023)
Breakout Brothers 3 (2022)
Breakout Brothers 2 (2022)
Raging Fire (2021)
Breakout Brothers (2020)
A Witness Out of the Blue (2019)
Fatal Visit (2019)
First Class Charge (2019)
P Storm (2019)
The Fatal Raid (2018)
The Choice (2018)
Master Z: The Ip Man Legacy (2018)
L Storm (2018)
Dealer/Healer (2017)
Kick Ball (2017)
Witch Doctor (2016)
Insomnia Lover (2016)
Love in Late Autumn (2016)
Ip Man 3 (2015)
The Spirit of the Swords (2015)
Wong Ka-Yan (2015)
The Merger (2015)
Port of Call (2015)
Two Thumbs Up (2015)
A Happy Life天天有喜(2014)
Just Another Margin (2014)
As the Light Goes Out (2014)
Fiery Thunderbolt Qin Ming (2013)
The House (2013)
Triad (2012)
Death Zone (2012)
A Land without Boundaries (2011)
The Detective 2 (2011)
I Love Hong Kong (2011)
Just Another Pandora's Box (2010)
Here Comes Fortune (2010)
To Live and Die in Mongkok (2009)
The Storm Warriors (2009)
Lady Cop & Papa Crook (2009)
Mr. Right (2008)
Trivial Matters (2007)
In Love with the Dead (2007)
Naraka 19 (2007)
Simply Actors (2007)
Luxury Fantasy (2007)
Eastern Legend (2007)
Who's Next (2007)
A Chinese Tall Story (2005)
The Myth (2005)
City of SARS (2003)
The Story of Long (2003)
My Troublesome Buddy (2003)
The New Option (2002)
The Wall (2002)
Body Puzzle (2002)
La Brassiere (2001) [cameo]
The Legend of Zu (2001)
Born Wild (2001)
Comeuppance (2000)
Crying Heart (2000)
Killers from Beijing (2000)
Homicidal Maniac (2000)
The Duel (2000)
The Legend of Speed (1999)
Purple Storm (1999)
My Loving Trouble 7 (1999)
Century of the Dragon (1999)
Love in the River (1998)
Operation Billionaires (1998)
Beast Cops (1998)
Point of No Return (1990)

TV series

References

External links 
Patrick Tam Yiu Man's Bilingual Forum

1969 births
Hong Kong expatriates in China
Living people
Cantopop singers
Hong Kong male film actors
Hong Kong male singers
Hong Kong male television actors
New Talent Singing Awards contestants
20th-century Hong Kong male actors
21st-century Hong Kong male actors